Kristina Lyn Koznick (born November 24, 1975) is a former World Cup alpine ski racer from the United States. She raced in the technical events and specialized in slalom.

Racing career
Born in Apple Valley, Minnesota, Koznick learned to ski and race at the modest Buck Hill ski area in her hometown of Burnsville, a suburb south of Minneapolis.

Koznick has six World Cup victories, 20 podiums (all in slalom), and 55 top ten finishes (4 in giant slalom, 51 in slalom).  She was the runner-up in the slalom season standings twice (1998, 2002), and her best overall World Cup placing was 8th in the 2002 season.

Koznick competed in three Winter Olympics (1998–2006) Her last World Cup race was in February 2006, prior to the 2006 Winter Olympics in Torino, her last international event.

Following the 2000 World Cup season, a 24-year-old Koznick left the U.S. Ski Team and raced for the United States as an independent for the next six seasons, until her retirement. This set a precedent, as Bode Miller would later follow in her footsteps as an independent for two seasons in 2008 and 2009. In 2015, she was inducted into the National Polish-American Sports Hall of Fame.

After racing
After retiring from international competition in July 2006, Koznick became a broadcaster for NBC Sports. She made her debut that December, handling post-race interviews for alpine skiing events. Her most recent appearance on the network was in December 2008, covering the men's World Cup races in Beaver Creek, Colorado.

Koznick now has a family and plays for the Vail Breakaways, a women's hockey team in Vail, CO.

World Cup results

Race victories
6 wins  (6 SL)
20 podiums (20 SL)

Season standings

References

External links
 
 Kristina Koznick World Cup standings at the International Ski Federation 
 
 
 
 Koznick announces retirement - 12 July 2006 at SkiNet.com

American female alpine skiers
Alpine skiers at the 2006 Winter Olympics
Alpine skiers at the 2002 Winter Olympics
Alpine skiers at the 1998 Winter Olympics
Olympic alpine skiers of the United States
People from Burnsville, Minnesota
1975 births
Living people
Skiing announcers
People from Apple Valley, Minnesota
American people of Polish descent
21st-century American women